Viola rupestris is a species of flowering plant belonging to the family Violaceae.

It is native to Temperate Eurasia.

References

rupestris